Clauberg is a German surname.  Notable people with the surname include:

Carl Clauberg (1898–1957), German Nazi physician who participated in criminal medical experiments
Claus Clauberg (1890–1963), German musician and composer
Johannes Clauberg (1622–1665), German theologian and philosopher
Karl Wilhelm Clauberg (1893−1985), German bacteriologist

German-language surnames